Barechhina is a village in Almora district, Uttarakhand, 18 km from the district headquarters, the city of Almora.  
. It lies on highway from Almora-Barechhina-Dhaulchina-Sheraghat-RaiAgar-Berinag-Chaukori-Thal-Tejam to Munsiyari.

Pre-historic art
Barechhina is also noted for its two pre-historic painted rock shelters, at 'Lakhudiyar', which literally means 'one lakh caves',<ref>Lakhudiyar  Almora city, Official website.</ref> on the banks of Suyal river, it has with paintings of animals, humans and also tectiforms done with fingers in black, red and white colours,Uttarakhand Arts and engravings of trishul and Swastika.

These images have now become a tourist attraction as well  It is also the site for archaeological rock engravings being studied by Indira Gandhi National Centre for the Arts, New Delhi.

,GIC BARECHHINA  Govt. of Uttarakhand Official website. a Govt girls inter college. Some private schools also performing well like maharshi vidhya mandir. A newly opened HP petrol pump is fully operational in barechhina and you can have a pure veg meal round the clock at jai guru hotel near Bhatt sports with lodging facility at very reasonable price.

Geography
Barechhina is situated at 

Further reading
 Rock art in Kumaon Himalaya'', by  Mathpal, Yashodhar. New Delhi: Indira Gandhi National Centre for the Arts, Aryan Books International, 1995. .

References

External links
 Rock Art of Kumaon :: Himvan.com Photo Gallery
 Rock Art of Kumaon :: Kuamon Kala Shilp Aur Sanskriti :: Himvan.com
Series of rock art images at IGNCA
 Engraved trishula (trident) Image

Almora
Villages in Almora district